José María López de Silva Sánchez (born 1 February 1983), known as López Silva, is a Spanish professional footballer who plays for UD Tamaraceite as a winger.

Club career
Born in Huelva, Andalusia, López Silva joined Valencia CF after finishing his development at Real Madrid, and was part of the reserves' setup in the 2002–03 season in the Segunda División B, even though he failed to appear in any games. In the summer of 2004, he signed with CD Linares of the same league.

López Silva continued to compete in the third division the following years, representing Burgos CF, CD Alcalá, Orihuela CF and Cádiz CF. With the latter, he achieved promotion to Segunda División, contributing three goals from 32 appearances.

On 30 August 2009, aged 26, López Silva played his first match as a professional, starting in a 0–1 home loss against UD Salamanca. He scored his first goal on 8 November, his team's first in a 2–2 home draw with Real Betis.

On 15 June 2011, López Silva signed a two-year deal with Córdoba CF also in the second tier. In his third year he appeared in 40 matches and scored three times, helping the side return to La Liga after a 42-year absence.

López Silva made his debut in the Spanish top flight on 25 August 2014, starting the 2–0 defeat at Real Madrid. He left the club in June 2016, and subsequently joined CD Alcoyano of division three.

On 25 July 2018, López Silva joined Tercera División side UD Tamaraceite.

References

External links

Stats and bio at Cadistas1910 

1983 births
Living people
Spanish footballers
Footballers from Huelva
Association football wingers
La Liga players
Segunda División players
Segunda División B players
Tercera División players
Segunda Federación players
Tercera Federación players
Real Madrid Castilla footballers
Valencia CF Mestalla footballers
CD Linares players
Burgos CF footballers
CD Alcalá players
Orihuela CF players
Cádiz CF players
Córdoba CF players
CD Alcoyano footballers
UD Tamaraceite footballers